Voltage-gated proton channels are ion channels that have the unique property of opening with depolarization, but in a strongly pH-sensitive manner. The result is that these channels open only when the electrochemical gradient is outward, such that their opening will only allow protons to leave cells. Their function thus appears to be acid extrusion from cells.

Another important function occurs in phagocytes (e.g. eosinophils, neutrophils, and macrophages) during the respiratory burst. When bacteria or other microbes are engulfed by phagocytes, the enzyme NADPH oxidase assembles in the membrane and begins to produce reactive oxygen species (ROS) that help kill bacteria. NADPH oxidase is electrogenic, moving electrons across the membrane, and proton channels open to allow proton flux to balance the electron movement electrically.
The functional expression of Hv1 in phagocytes has been well characterized in mammals, and recently in zebrafish, suggesting its important roles in the immune cells of mammals and non-mammalian vertebrates.
A group of small molecule inhibitors of the Hv1 channel are shown as chemotherapeutics and anti-inflammatory agents.

When activated, the voltage-gated proton channel HV1 can allow up to 100,000 hydrogen ions across the membrane each second.  Whereas most voltage-gated ion channels contain a central pore that is surrounding by alpha helices and the voltage-sensing domain (VSD), voltage-gated hydrogen channels contain no central pore, so their voltage-sensing regions (VSD) carry out the job of bringing acidic protons across the membrane.  As mentioned, these voltage-gated hydrogen channels only carry outward current, meaning they are used to move acidic protons out of the membrane.  As a result, the opening of voltage-gated hydrogen channels usually hyperpolarize the cell membrane, or makes the membrane potential more negative.

A recent discovery has shown that the voltage-gated proton channel Hv1 is highly expressed in human breast tumor tissues that are metastatic, but not in non-metastatic breast cancer tissues.  Because it has also been found to be highly expressed in other cancer tissues, the study of the voltage-gated proton channel has led many scientists to wonder what its importance is in cancer metastasis. However, much is still being discovered concerning the structure and function of the voltage-gated proton channel.

Known types
HVCN1

References 

Ion channels
Immunology
Voltage-gated ion channels